The 1931–32 Detroit Falcons season was the sixth season of the Detroit franchise in the National Hockey League (NHL). The Falcons placed third in the American Division to qualify for the playoffs. The Falcons lost a two-game total-goals playoff to the Montreal Maroons.

Offseason

Regular season

Final standings

Record vs. opponents

Schedule and results

Playoffs

(C3) Montreal Maroons vs. (A3) Detroit Falcons

Montreal M. wins a total goal series 3 goals to 1.

Player statistics

Regular season
Scoring

Goaltending

Playoffs
Scoring

Goaltending

Note: GP = Games played; G = Goals; A = Assists; Pts = Points; +/- = Plus-minus PIM = Penalty minutes; PPG = Power-play goals; SHG = Short-handed goals; GWG = Game-winning goals;
      MIN = Minutes played; W = Wins; L = Losses; T = Ties; GA = Goals against; GAA = Goals-against average;  SO = Shutouts;

Awards and records

Transactions

See also
1931–32 NHL season

References

Bibliography

External links

Detroit Red Wings seasons
Detroit
Detroit
Detroit Falcons
Detroit Falcons